Brass Commandments is a 1923 American silent Western film directed by Lynn Reynolds and starring William Farnum, Wanda Hawley, and Tom Santschi. The novel of the same name by Charles Alden Seltzer that the film is based upon was later filmed as Chain Lightning (1927).

Plot
As described in a film magazine, Flash Lanning (Farnum) returns West as the request of the sheriff to put an end to the cattle rustling. In the small hotel he finds a big bully attempting to kiss Gloria Hallowell (Hawley), the young woman at the desk, and he immediately goes to her assistance. She does not recognize him but tells him of her love for Lanning, although she has never met him. Flash does not tell her that he is that man, and when she finds out later, she changes her feelings in the matter. Flash is attacked by Campan (Santschi), the leader of the local gang, but he overpowers him and tells the man to leave town. Ellen Bosworth (Adams), returning to her ranch, overhears that supposed friend Clearwater (Gordon) is one of the rustlers. She tells Flash of this, and he forces Clearwater to warn him of when the next raid will be conducted. However, Campan captures the two young women and takes them into the desert. Flash learns of this and sets out in pursuit. A sandstorm overtakes Campan and his party and they are about to perish when Flash arrives. He rescues the two young women and leaves Campan to his fate. He tells Gloria of his love for her and she of her love for him.

Cast
 William Farnum as Stephen 'Flash' Lanning 
 Wanda Hawley as Gloria Hallowell 
 Tom Santschi as Campan 
 Claire Adams as Ellen Bosworth 
 Charles Le Moyne as Dave De Vake 
 Joe Rickson as Tularosa 
 Lon Poff as Slim Lally 
 Al Fremont as Bill Perrin 
 Joseph Gordon as Clearwater 
 C.E. Anderson as Bannock

Preservation
Brass Commandments is not listed as a holding in any film archives making it a lost film.

References

Bibliography
 Solomon, Aubrey. The Fox Film Corporation, 1915-1935: A History and Filmography. McFarland, 2011.

External links

 
 

1923 films
1923 Western (genre) films
Films directed by Lynn Reynolds
Fox Film films
American black-and-white films
Silent American Western (genre) films
1920s English-language films
1920s American films